The We Will Rock You Original London Cast Recording is a live album released in promotion of the award-winning West End musical We Will Rock You (musical) in 2002. The album was recorded over two nights of the original West End production at the Dominion Theatre and was the first audio release of the musical. Both instrumental pieces (Ogre Battle and One Vision) are the original recordings made by Queen in 1973 and 1985 respectively. The recording misses several tracks that were present in the original production. These are: Bicycle Race, Crazy Little Thing Called Love, Death On Two Legs (Dedicated to...), Fat Bottomed Girls and Headlong (Reprise).

In 2012, a special 2-CD 10th Anniversary edition was produced, consisting of the original album along with a CD of bonus material.

Track listing

Original album

Bonus CD (10th Anniversary)
 Sólo Por Ti (No One But You) (In Spanish) (Short Version) – Eva Maria Cortes, Queen
 Sin Control (Headlong) (In Spanish) – The Spanish Cast
 Algo Loco Es El Amor (Crazy Little Thing Called Love) (In Spanish) – The Spanish Cast
 Killer Queen (In German) – The German Cast
 Play The Game (In German) – The German Cast
 Bohemian Rhapsody ('Party at the Palace' Live At Buckingham Palace, 2002) - The London Cast, Queen
 Radio Ga Ga ["Wetten, dass..?" German TV Live Performance, 2004] – The German Cast
 Somebody To Love ["Wetten, dass..?" German TV Live Performance, 2004] - The German Cast, Queen
 We Will Rock You ["Wetten, dass..?" German TV Live Performance, 2004] - The German Cast, Queen
 We Are The Champions ["Wetten, dass..?" German TV Live Performance, 2004] - The German Cast, Queen

Personnel
Performers
Sharon D. Clarke (Killer Queen)
Nigel Clauzel (Brit)
Kerry Ellis (Meat)
Hannah Jane Fox (Scaramouche)
Alexander Hanson (Khashoggi)
Nigel Planer (Pop)
Tony Vincent (Gallileo)

Band
Tony Bourke (Drums)
Alan Darby (Guitar)
Mike Dixon (Piano)
Spike Edney (Keyboards)
Jeff Leach (Keyboards, Synthesisers)
Neil Murray (Bass)
Julian Poole (Percussion)
Andy Smith (Keyboards)
Laurie Wisefield (Guitar)

Writers
John Deacon (Music, Lyrics)
Ben Elton (Script)
Brian May (Music, Lyrics)
Freddie Mercury (Music, Lyrics)
Roger Taylor (Music, Lyrics)

Production
Catherine Ashmore (Photography)
Jim Beach (Management)
Dave Bennett (Photography)
Richard Gray (Packaging)
Joshua J. Macrae (Mixing)
Justin Shirley Smith (Mixing)
Miles Showell (Mastering)
Mixed at Allerton Hill Studio and Cosford Mill Studio. Mastered at Metropolis Mastering.

References

2002 soundtrack albums
Theatre soundtracks
Queen (band)
Cast recordings
EMI Records soundtracks